The 2012 EPZ Omloop van Borsele was the 11th running of the Omloop van Borsele, a women's cycling event in 's-Heerenhoek, the Netherlands. It was rated by the UCI as 1.2 category race.

After winning the time trial of Borsele,  rider Ellen van Dijk won also the road race of the EPZ Omloop van Borsele. She won the sprint of a group of seven riders ahead of Gracie Elvin from Australia (Australian national team) and Sarah Düster from Germany (Rabobank Women Cycling Team).

Time trial

Results

Source

Road race

Race report

The race took place on a wet course on 21 April. After 25 kilometer a group of 6 riders emerged (Ellen van Dijk, Gracie Elvin, Chantal Blaak, Amy Pieters, Iris Slappendel, Megan Guarner and Melissa Hoskins). Slapendel (Rabobank Women Cycling Team) had to leave the group due to material damage. Sarah Düster was able to ride to the front group and so the Rabobank Women Cycling Team had another rider at the front. Due to good teamwork the seven riders were not pulled back by the bunch with among others the world champion Giorgia Bronzini. In the final kilometers Elvin and Düster tried both to escape but it was Van Dijk who reached first the finish line.

Results

Sources

See also
2012 in women's road cycling

References

External links

Omloop van Borsele
2012 in Dutch sport
2012 in women's road cycling